Thigli  is a village in Kapurthala district of Punjab State, India. The village is administrated by a Sarpanch who is an elected representative of village as per the constitution of India and Panchayati raj (India).

Kapurthala - 0 km, Dhilwan - 17 km, Nadala - 21 km, Rayya-6 - 25 km  are the nearest taluks and Kapurthala - 2 km, Jalandhar - 21 km, Tarn Taran - 50 km and Hoshiarpur- 59 km are the nearby District Headquarters to the village.

Transport 
Kapurthala - 0 km, Kartarpur - 13 km, Jalandhar - 22 km and Jalandhar Cantt. - 24 km are the nearby Cities to Thigli.

Train 
Kapurthala Railway station - 1 km, Rail Coach Factory Railway station - 7 km, Khojewala Railway station - 9 km and Husainpur Railway station - 10 km are the very nearby railway stations to Thigli, however Jalandhar City Railway station is major railway station is 23  km away from Thigli village.

Air
Raja Sansi airport:- 73 km, Pathankot airport:- 107 km, Ludhiana airport:- 77 km and Gaggal airport:- 148 km nearest airports are available to Thigli village.

Schools 
 Government Public School, Thigli.

Colleges 
 College Of Engineering & Management, Kapurthala.
 Guru Nanak College Of Education For Women, Kapurthala.
 NSJA Government College, Kapurthala.
 CAPARO P.T.U.School Of Manufacturing And Materials Technology, Kapurthala.

Air travel connectivity 
The closest airport to the village is Sri Guru Ram Dass Jee International Airport.

Villages in Kapurthala

References

External links
  Villages in Kapurthala
 Kapurthala Villages List

Villages in Kapurthala district